Arvid Mörne (6 May 1876 – 15 June 1946) was a Finnish author and poet.
He was nominated for the Nobel Prize in Literature four times.

Life
Mörne was born in Kuopio. He obtained a master's degree in literature and history at the University of Helsinki in 1897, and a PhD in 1910. He worked as a superintendent at the Nyland's folk high school Finns between 1899–1909, and as a teacher at the same school between 1909–11. He was forced to leave this position after his involvement in the General Strike of 1905.

He became a docent of nedijnji at the University of Helsinki in 1913, a position he held until 1943. He worked at the newspapers Nyländska posten (1900–1902) and Veckans Nyheter (1902–1904) and also at Arbetaren and Helsingforsposten. He was also a literature critic for the newspapers Dagens Press and Svenska Pressen.

His socialistic viewpoints would be reflected in his poetry, but he also felt strong for the weakest and for the Finnish archipelago nature. He also wrote the lyrics for the popular Swedish song "Båklandets vackra Maja" (with music composed by Hanna Hagbom).

He was married to the actress Signe Hagelstam and had three children. His works would eventually become more popular after his death in Kauniainen in 1946, and today he is considered one of the prime Finnish poets of the 20th century.

The Arvid Mörne competition in literature is named after him and given every year by Svenska Folkskolans Vänner.

Prizes and awards
 De Nios stora pris 1931
 De Nios stora pris 1940

Selected works
Rytm och rim (lyric poetry) (1899)
Nya sånger (lyric poetry) (1901)
Bland bränningarna (play) (1903)
Ny tid (lyric poetry) (1903)
Josef Julius Wecksell. En studie (academic dissertation) (1909)
Döda år (lyric poetry) (1910)
Alexis Kivi och hans novel "Seitsemän veljestä" (history of literature) (1911)
Skärgårdens vår (lyric poetry) (1913)
Den svenska jorden. En nyländsk novell (short story) (1913)
Ödemarksdramer I. Den helige Henricus (play) (1914)
Från "Saima" till "Vikingen" (history) (1916)
Sommarnatten (lyric poetry) (1916)
Strandbyggaröden 1–3 (short stories) (1917)
Den röde våren (novel) (1917)
Fädernearvet (play) (1918)
Offer och segrar från Finlands kampår (lyric poetry) (1918)
Sverige och det svenska Finland (essay) (1918)
Höstlig dikt (lyric poetry) (1919)
Samlade dikter 1-9 (lyric poetry collections) (1919)
Nya Wecksell-studier (history of literature) (1920)
Solens återkomst (play) (1920)
Inför havets anlete (novel) (1921)
Kristina Bjur (novel) (1922)
Karl-Kristians julnatt (short story) (1923)
Vandringen och vägen (lyric poetry) (1924)
Ett liv (novel) (1925)
Dikter i urval (lyric poetry collection) (1926)
Mörkret och lågan (lyric poetry) (1926)
Axel Olof Freudenthal och den finlandssvenska nationalitetstanken (history) (1927)
Morgonstjärnan (lyric poetry) (1928)
Någon går förbi på vägen (short stories) (1928)
Den förborgade källan (lyric poetry) (1930)
Det ringer kväll (lyric poetry) (1931)
Under vintergatan (lyric poetry) (1934)
Hjärtat och svärdet (lyric poetry) (1935)
Axel Olof Freudenthal. Liv och gärning (bibliography) (1936)
Vandringsdagen. Lyrik i urval 1924-1935 (lyric poetry collection) (1936)
Atlantisk bränning (lyric poetry) (1937)
Lyriker och berättare. Finlandssvenska studier (literature history) (1939)
Över havet brann Mars (lyric poetry) (1939)
Sånger i världsskymning (lyric poetry) (1941)
Det övergivna samvetet (collection of essays) (1943)
Sfinxen och pyramiden (lyric poetry) (1944)
Det förlorade landet och andra berättelser (short stories) (1945)
Solbärgning (lyric poetry collection) (1946)
Vårstorm. Lyrik i urval 1899-1919 (lyric poetry collection) (1947)
Sista milen. Lyrik i urval 1937-1946 (lyric poetry collection) (1947)

References

Sources
Ekman, Michel (red.): Finlands svenska litteraturhistoria II, uppslagsdelen, Helsingfors 2000
Warburton, Thomas: Åttio år finlandssvensk litteratur, Jakobstad 1984

Further reading 

 

 

 

1876 births
1946 deaths
People from Kuopio
People from Kuopio Province (Grand Duchy of Finland)
Finnish writers in Swedish
Finnish poets in Swedish
Writers from North Savo
University of Helsinki alumni